Jazz Samba Encore! is a bossa nova album by Stan Getz and Luiz Bonfá, released on the Verve label. It is bossa nova in a slower groove. It contains a mix of Jobim standards as well as originals from Bonfá. Performers also include Antonio Carlos Jobim and vocalist Maria Toledo, Bonfá's wife. The painting on the cover is a piece by the influential New York based abstract expressionist Olga Albizu from Puerto Rico.

Track listing
 "Sambalero" (Luiz Bonfá) – 2:08
 "Só Danço Samba (I Only Dance Samba)" (Antônio Carlos Jobim/Vinicius de Moraes) – 3:36
 "Insensatez (How Insensitive)" (Jobim/de Moraes) – 3:21
 "O Morro Não Tem Vez" (Favela) (Jobim/de Moraes) – 6:53
 "Samba de Duas Notas (Two Note Samba)" (Luiz Bonfá) – 4:18 (reference to Jobim's "One Note Samba")
 "Menina Flor" (Bonfá/Maria Toledo) – 4:08
 "Mania de Maria" (Bonfá/Maria Toledo) – 2:43
 "Saudade Vem Correndo" (Bonfá/Maria Toledo) – 3:39
 "Um Abração no Getz (A Tribute to Getz)" (Bonfá) – 4:23
 "Ebony Samba – Second Version" (Bonfá) – 4:33
 "Ebony Samba – First Version" (Bonfá) – 3:48 *

(bonus CD track)

Personnel
Stan Getz – tenor saxophone
Luiz Bonfá – guitar
Antônio Carlos Jobim – guitar, piano (on track 3)
George Duvivier, Tommy Williams, Don Payne – bass
Paulo Ferreira, Jose Carlos, Dave Bailey – drums
Maria Toledo except 2,4,7 and 9 – vocals (tracks 3 and 8), brief vocalise

In popular culture
The bridge of "Saudade Vem Correndo" is prominently sampled in the 1995 song "Runnin'" by hip hop group The Pharcyde, from their album Labcabincalifornia. In turn, "Runnin" is interpolated in the 2003 song "Fallen" by R&B singer Mýa, from her album Moodring. "Saudade Vem Correndo" is also sampled in the 2019 song "Make Believe" by rapper Juice WRLD, from his album Death Race for Love.

References 

1963 albums
Bossa nova albums
Stan Getz albums
Verve Records albums
Albums produced by Creed Taylor
MGM Records albums
Luiz Bonfá albums